Jacques Grattarola (16 February 1930 – 6 January 2023) was a French footballer who played as a forward.

Biography
Grattarola began his professional career with AS Cannes, for whom he played from 1948 to 1952 and again from 1955 to 1960. From 1952 to 1955, he played for AS Saint-Étienne. In total, he played in 49 matches in Division 1 and 193 matches in Division 2.

References

1930 births
2023 deaths
Sportspeople from Cannes
French footballers
Association football forwards
Ligue 1 players
Ligue 2 players
AS Saint-Étienne players
AS Cannes players